St. Michael is an oil painting by the Italian late Baroque artist Luca Giordano, painted in  1663, and now exhibited at the Gemäldegalerie, Berlin. Its dimensions are 198 × 147 cm.

References

External links
 

 

1663 paintings
Paintings by Luca Giordano
Paintings depicting Michael (archangel)
Paintings in the Gemäldegalerie, Berlin